The Islamic Centre (officially named Masjid al-Sultan Muhammad Thakurufaanu al-Auzam) is an architectural landmark in Malé, Maldives opened in November 1984 by President Maumoon Abdul Gayoom.

The Islamic Centre was built with the assistance of the Saudi Arabian government in the 1980s, and it was opened in November 1984. The building is an impressive structure, with a large golden dome and a minaret that stands at 142 feet tall. The building was designed by a group of Maldivian architects and engineers, and it was constructed using traditional Islamic architectural elements and local materials.

The Grand Friday Mosque located in the centre is named after one of the most celebrated Maldivian heroes, Sultan Muhammad Thakurufaanu al-Auzam of the Maldives. The mosque is the second largest in the Maldives after the King Salman Mosque, and also one of the largest in South Asia, admitting over 5,000 people.

The centre also serves as a conference hall where official meetings and ceremonies are held, an Islamic library and a number of offices.

The centre also houses the Ministry of Islamic-Affairs from 11 November 2008 onwards, which replaced the Supreme Council of Islamic Affairs that was established by the former president Mamoon Abdul Gayoom.

Furthermore, the Islamic Centre acts as a major tourist attraction of Malé, because of its location near the main jetty of Malé and due to the beautiful architecture of the mosque. The magnificent golden dome of the mosque is also evident on the skyline of Malé. The shining golden dome of the mosque is a standout as are also the interior walls decorated with beautiful woodcarvings and Arabic calligraphy. The center also houses a library and a conference hall. The most famous architectural landmark of Male’ is the three-storey Islamic Centre, opened in November 1984. The center's Grand Friday Mosque, Masjid al-Sultan Muhammad Thakurufaanu al-Auzam, is the second biggest in the Maldives, accommodating more than 5,000 worshippers.

See also
 Islam in the Maldives
 History of Maldives
 Culture of Maldives

References

Event venues in the Maldives
Mosques in the Maldives
Mosques completed in 1984